"Direzione la vita" is a song by Italian singer-songwriter Annalisa. It was written by Annalisa, Davide Simonetta and Raige, and produced by Michele Canova.

It was released by Warner Music Italy on 13 October 2017 as the lead single from her sixth studio album Bye Bye. The song peaked at number 43 on the FIMI Singles Chart and was certified platinum in Italy.

Music video
The music video for "Direzione la vita", directed by Mauro Russo, was first released onto YouTube on 19 October 2017.

Track listing

Charts

Certifications

References

2017 singles
2017 songs
Annalisa songs
Songs written by Davide Simonetta
Songs written by Annalisa